Concho River Review is an American literary magazine based in San Angelo, Texas.  The magazine was founded by Terry Dalrymple in 1987 and publishes short stories, poetry, creative non-fiction, interviews, and book reviews by or about Southwestern authors and about Southwestern themes.

Masthead 
General editor: Erin Ashworth-King
Fiction editor:  Andrew Geyer
Nonfiction editor: Carol Reposa
Poetry editor: Jerry Bradley
Book review editor: R. Mark Jackson

Notable contributors 
Seth Abramson
Jacob M. Appel
Wendy Barker
Robert Cooperman
Paul Dickey
Robert Flynn
A.C. Greene
R.S. Gwynn
Jane Hammons
Rolando Hinojosa
Walt McDonald
Robert McGuill
Ann McVay
Joe Edward Morris
Naomi Shihab Nye
Clay Reynolds
Ryan Shoemaker
Roland Sodowsky
Jan Seale
Christopher Wood

Interviews
A regular component of the fall issue is an interview with the featured writer at the Angelo State University Writers Conference, held in late February. CRR has published interviews with featured writers since the conference's inception in 1996.  Authors interviewed include Naomi Shihab Nye, Peter Hedges, Gordon Weaver, Tim O'Brien, Tobias Wolff, Luis Valdez, Terrance Hayes, Mary Karr, and Leslie Marmon Silko.  The Spring 2013 issue also features an interview with 2102 Texas Poet Laureate Jan Seale.

See also
List of literary magazines

References

External links
 Official website

1987 establishments in Texas
Angelo State University
Biannual magazines published in the United States
Literary magazines published in the United States
Magazines established in 1987
Magazines published in Texas
Mass media in San Angelo, Texas